James Waldrop was the head baseball coach of the LSU Tigers baseball team from 1964 to 1965 and Southeastern Louisiana Lions baseball team from 1967 to 1972.

During his 9 seasons as head coach, he coached in 248 games, winning 98, losing 147 with 3 ties for a  winning percentage. Waldrop's record at LSU was 17–24–1 (9-18 SEC) over two seasons. His record at Southeastern Louisiana was 81–123–2 (19-17 conference record) over 7 seasons. 

Waldrop also served as an assistant football coach for the Southeastern Louisiana Lions football team.

Playing career
Waldrop was an All-Conference guard for the Southeastern Louisiana Lions basketball team. He was also a member of the Southeastern Louisiana Lions football team. In 1940, he scored a then-school single game record three touchdowns in a game. Waldrop later played minor league baseball.

References

Baseball coaches from Louisiana
LSU Tigers baseball coaches
Southeastern Louisiana Lions baseball coaches
Southeastern Louisiana Lions football coaches
Sportspeople from Baton Rouge, Louisiana
Sportspeople from Hammond, Louisiana